Tamás Märcz (born 17 July 1974) is a Hungarian water polo player who played on the gold medal squad at the 2000 Summer Olympics.
He was the head coach of Hungary men's national water polo team between 1 January 2017 and 18 July 2022.

He has played in the Italian Water polo Serie A and has played in Malta with Sirens, winning a knockout title.

Honours

National
 Olympic Games:  Gold medal – 2000
 World Championships:  Silver medal – 1998
 European Championship:  Gold medal – 1997, 1999;  Silver medal – 1995;  Bronze medal – 2001
 FINA World Cup:  Gold medal – 1999
 Junior World Championships: (Bronze medal – 1993)
 Junior European Championship: (Gold medal – 1992)

Club
European competitions:
  LEN Cup Winner (1): (2005 – with Savona)
  LEN Super Cup Winner (1): (2008 – with Pro Recco)
Domestic competitions: 
 Hungarian Championship (OB I): 4x (1996, 1997, 1998, 1999 – with BVSC)
 Hungarian Cup (Magyar Kupa): 2x (1995, 2000 – with BVSC)
  Italian Championship (Serie A1): 2x (2005 – with Savona; 2009 – with Pro Recco)
  Italian Cup: 1x (2009 – with Pro Recco)

Awards
 Member of the Hungarian team of the year: 1997, 1999, 2000
 Széchenyi-medallion (2000)
 Csanádi-díj: 2001

Orders
  Officer's Cross of the Order of Merit of the Republic of Hungary (2000)

See also
 Hungary men's Olympic water polo team records and statistics
 List of Olympic champions in men's water polo
 List of Olympic medalists in water polo (men)
 List of World Aquatics Championships medalists in water polo

References

External links
 

1974 births
Living people
Water polo players from Budapest
Hungarian male water polo players
Water polo drivers
Water polo players at the 2000 Summer Olympics
Medalists at the 2000 Summer Olympics
Olympic gold medalists for Hungary in water polo
Hungarian water polo coaches
Hungary men's national water polo team coaches
Water polo coaches at the 2020 Summer Olympics
20th-century Hungarian people
21st-century Hungarian people